Kandie is a surname of Kenyan origin. Notable people with the surname include:

Kibiwott Kandie (born 1996), Kenyan long-distance runner, holder of half marathon world record
Phyllis Kandie (born c. 1965), Kenyan politician
Samson Kandie (born 1971), Kenyan long-distance runner

Kenyan names